Kolohe Andino (born March 22, 1994, in San Clemente, California) is an American surfer. Andino began surfing at a young age and holds the record for winning the most National Scholastic Surfing Association (NSSA) titles of any male competitor, becoming the youngest to win one at age 15 in 2009. His breakthrough happened in 2011 after he won the Vans Pier Classic and the ASP 6-Star Quiksilver Brazil Open of Surfing. In 2019, Andino qualified to represent the United States at the 2020 Summer Olympics in surfing.

His name, Kolohe, means "little rascal" in Hawaiian.

Surfing career
Son of top-ranked surfer, Dino Andino, Kolohe Andino began surfing at a young age as he followed his father to surfing trips; by age 8, Andino had already begun fielding sponsors who wished to represent him. By high school, he had retained professional surfer Mike Parsons as his coach and at age 15, Andino became the youngest winner of an National Scholastic Surfing Association (NSSA) title and holds the record for the most NSSA championships won by a male competitor, at nine overall. That same year, Andino also won two USA Surfing championship titles at the Lower Trestles in the Under 16 and Under 18 competitions.

Andino's breakthrough event happened in 2011 when he won both the ASP 6-Star Quiksilver Brazil Open of Surfing and the Vans Pier Classic world tour events. On January 8, 2015, he triumphed in the first-ever World Surf League (WSL) event, the World Surf League Surf City Pro held in Huntington Beach, California.

In 2019, Andino qualified to represent the United States at the 2020 Summer Olympics for surfing by finishing as one of the top two Americans at the 2019 World Surf League, and one of the top ten surfers overall.
He is the first U.S. surfer ever to have qualified for the Olympic games. At the Olympics, he was eliminated in the quarterfinal round by Japan's Kanoa Igarashi.

In February 2021, while preparing for the year's WSL competitive season, Andino sprained his right ankle and re-aggravated the injury the following month, forcing him to require surgery and withdraw from the Australia leg of the tour.

Personal life
Andino married his wife, Madison Aldrich, in San Clemente, California on January 7, 2018. The couple is expecting their first child in 2021.

References

External links
  Profile @ World Surf League
 Article in  Sports Illustrated

1994 births
American surfers
Living people
World Surf League surfers
Surfers at the 2020 Summer Olympics
Olympic surfers of the United States
People from San Clemente, California